Anicet Sambo is a Malagasy boxer. He competed in the men's featherweight event at the 1980 Summer Olympics.

References

Year of birth missing (living people)
Living people
Malagasy male boxers
Olympic boxers of Madagascar
Boxers at the 1980 Summer Olympics
Place of birth missing (living people)
Featherweight boxers